The Winston School (also known as a Strawberry School) is a historic school in Lakeland, Florida. It is located at 3415 Swindell Road. On December 20, 2001, it was added to the U.S. National Register of Historic Places.

Gallery

References

 Polk County listings at National Register of Historic Places
 Winston Elementary at Florida's Office of Cultural and Historical Programs

Public elementary schools in Florida
Schools in Lakeland, Florida
National Register of Historic Places in Polk County, Florida